Henry Albert Seymour (28 January 1860 – 3 February 1938) was an English secularist, individualist anarchist, gramophone innovator and survey author, and Baconian. He published the first English language anarchist periodical in Britain and is credited, in 1913, with introducing the Edison disc into the country.

Biography
Seymour was born in Hayes, Bromley, England on 28 January 1860. He married Clara Elizabeth Spice on 2 November 1880.

Seymour first came to prominence in 1882, while living in Tunbridge Wells, Kent. Seymour was appointed the secretary of the Tunbridge Wells Secular Society and he was convicted in the summer of 1882 of blasphemy.

In 1885, Seymour published the first English-language individualist anarchist periodical in Britain, The Anarchist. He began work on the first issue while still living in Tunbridge Wells, although it was not published until he completed his move to Islington, London.

The paper was produced from 1885 to 1888 and was briefly co-edited by Peter Kropotkin and Charlotte Wilson, both of whom went on to form Freedom following disagreements between the three.

As well as producing The Anarchist, Seymour published a wide range of pamphlets and tracts, and he printed handbills for other groups, including the Tunbridge Wells branch of the SDF. The SDF pamphlet was published by the "International Publishing Company", owned by Seymour.

Seymour is important in the history of British anarchism, particularly individualist anarchism a branch of anarchism which has dwindled in influence in Britain since the early 20th century. Seymour published a wide range of works on anarchist subjects. He was involved in the late 19th century radical community in London and it seems likely that Seymour printed material for many individuals and groups.

Seymour was involved in many groups and causes during the latter 1900s. He was a founding member of Free Currency Propaganda and produced a pamphlet called The Monomaniacs: A Fable in Finance.

Seymour took over editorship of The Adult: A Journal for the Advancement of freedom in Sexual Relationships, following the arrest of George Bedborough, the previous editor.

In the early 20th century, Seymour became involved in the nascent gramophone industry. He introduced Edison's phonograph to Britain in 1913, and wrote about it in Sound Wave magazine. He wrote The Reproduction of Sound in 1917, described as "acknowledged as the standard work on the subject" in the industry at the time. He produced a gramophone called the Superphone and was responsible for many innovations in gramophone technology.

Seymour was key in the development of EMG Gramophones and produced parts for the early production models.

In his later life Seymour became involved in the Francis Bacon Society, and was the editor of the society's journal, Baconiana. His wife died in 1934.

Seymour died in Islington, on 3 February 1938, at the age of 78.

Bibliography

References

External links
  – Seymour bibliography

1860 births
1938 deaths
Baconian theory of Shakespeare authorship
British secularists
English anarchists
English inventors
English magazine editors
English pamphleteers
Individualist anarchists